The Other Woman's Story is a 1925 American silent drama film directed by B.F. Stanley and starring Alice Calhoun, Robert Frazer, and Helen Lee Worthing. In America it was distributed by the independent outfit Preferred Pictures while its British release was originally to be handled by Vitagraph, before that company was acquired by Warner Bros. who distributed it on the British market.

Plot
As described in a film magazine review, Mrs. Colby, a woman seeking a divorce and naming her husband’s female business partner Jean Prentiss as a co-respondent, retains an attorney who, before his work is finished, is murdered. Suspicion points to the husband. The woman named as the co-respondent uncovers evidence that proves the wife guilty of the murder, killing Robert Marshall in a jealous rage. With this evidence, Jean reverses the verdict of guilty brought against her new husband.

Cast

References

Bibliography
 Connelly, Robert B. The Silents: Silent Feature Films, 1910-36, Volume 40, Issue 2. December Press, 1998.
 Munden, Kenneth White. The American Film Institute Catalog of Motion Pictures Produced in the United States, Part 1. University of California Press, 1997.

External links
 

1925 films
1925 drama films
1920s English-language films
American silent feature films
Silent American drama films
American black-and-white films
Preferred Pictures films
1920s American films